New Hampshire's 11th State Senate district is one of 24 districts in the New Hampshire Senate. It has been represented by Democrat Shannon Chandley since 2022.

Geography
District 11 covers much of central Hillsborough County between the cities of Manchester and Nashua, including the towns of Amherst, Merrimack, Milford, and Wilton.

The district is split between New Hampshire's 1st congressional district and New Hampshire's 2nd congressional district.

Recent election results

2022

Elections prior to 2022 were held under different district lines.

Historical election results

2020

2018

2016

2014

2012

Federal and statewide results in District 11

References

11
Hillsborough County, New Hampshire